Samar Samir Mezghanni (born 27 August 1988) is a Tunisian children's author.

Early life 
Mezghanni was born in 1988 to the Tunisian lawyer Samir Mezghanni and an Iraqi mother named Sahar. She has two brothers, Samer and Sirar, and one sister, Siwar.

Education 
Mezghanni earned a BA in psychology from Tunis El Manar University and a Master's from the University of Birmingham and is currently undertaking a doctorate in Middle Eastern Studies at the University of Cambridge.

Career 

Mezghanni has written over a hundred children stories and is a member of numerous Arabic and international organizations. Her first child story was published in September 1997. She holds the Guinness records for youngest published writer and the most prolific. Mezghanni has appeared on British media speaking out against extremism in the Middle East.

Awards & honors 
 One of the BBC's 100 Women 2013
 One of the 100 most powerful Arab women 2013 Link
 'The Youngest Writer in the World' in 2000 by the Guinness Book of World Records
 'Youngest Most Prolific Writer in the World' in 2002 by the Guinness Book of World Records
 Appeared in the Arabian Business list of 30 Under 30 in 2009
 2000 Child Book Award given by then-Tunisian President Zine El Abidine Ben Ali during the National Day of Culture
 Creativity Collar by the Iraqi Story House in 2002
 Honorary Member of the Tunisian Writers Union

Selected publications

Children's literature 
 Mohakamatou Dhi'ib (Trial of a Wolf)
 Holm Fi Hadeekat Al-Hayawanet (A Dream in the Zoo)

References

External links 

 
 Samar Mezghanni profile on Arabian Business' 30 Under 30

1988 births
Living people
Tunisian children's writers
Muslim writers
Tunisian activists
Tunisian women activists
Tunisian women children's writers
Alumni of the University of Birmingham
BBC 100 Women
20th-century Tunisian women writers
21st-century Tunisian women writers
21st-century Tunisian writers